The Azadi Volleyball Hall officially Known as Volleyball Federation Hall is an all-seater indoor arena located in Tehran, Iran. It is part of 5 Halls Complex within the Azadi Sport Complex. It seats 3,000 people.

Hosted events
Volleyball at the 1974 Asian Games
1992 Asian Junior Men's Volleyball Championship
1997 FIVB Volleyball Boys' U19 World Championship
1998 FIVB Volleyball Men's World Championship qualification AVC Qualification Pool D
1998 Asian Junior Men's Volleyball Championship
1999 Asian Men's Volleyball Championship
2000 Asian Junior Men's Volleyball Championship
2002 AVC Cup Men's Club Tournament
2002 Asian Junior Men's Volleyball Championship
2003 FIVB Volleyball Men's U21 World Championship
2004 Asian Men's Club Volleyball Championship
2005 Asian Youth Boys Volleyball Championship
2006 FIVB Volleyball Men's World Championship AVC Qualification Second Round Pool F
2006 Asian Junior Men's Volleyball Championship
2008 Asian Junior Men's Volleyball Championship
2010 FIVB Volleyball Men's World Championship AVC Qualification Second Round Pool D
2010 Asian Youth Boys Volleyball Championship
2011 Asian Men's Volleyball Championship
2012 Asian Youth Boys Volleyball Championship
2013 Asian Men's Club Volleyball Championship
2014 FIVB Volleyball Men's World Championship AVC Qualification Final Round Pool B
2015 Asian Men's Volleyball Championship
2019 Asian Men's Volleyball Championship
2021 FIVB Volleyball Boys' U19 World Championship
2022 Asian Boys' U18 Volleyball Championship

External links
Page on Azadi Sport Complex Official Website

Indoor arenas in Iran
Sports venues in Tehran
Volleyball venues in Iran